Hanul cu Tei ("The Linden tree Inn") is one of the few still standing old inns in central Bucharest, Romania.

It was built in 1833 by Anastasie Hagi Gheorghe Polizu and Ştefan Popovici, on the trading street of Lipscani. It was also called the Bezesten de pe Uliţa cea mare a Marchitanilor ("The Inn on the Wide Street of the Merchants"). It is the only historic inn in Bucharest that has preserved its shape exactly as it was at its origins. At its Blǎnari Street entrance, one can still see the original "seal" of the first owners ("A.P." and "S.P."). Each of the owners had 14 shops, located on top of deep, vaulted cellars. Only the pedestrian alley and guardian's room were of shared ownership. Important merchants of the time were hosted in this inn, including Constantin Atanasiu, who was to establish the store "La Vulturul de Mare cu Peştele în Ghiare" ("At the Sea Eagle holding a Fish in His Claws"), a building that still exists, hosting a bank nowadays, near the Cocor Store.

Today, the former inn is home to many art galleries and a cellar bar. Its ornate, forged iron gates provide access from both Lipscani and Blǎnari streets. It also provides a good example the typical Wallachian glass-covered façade, as the upper floor is covered by glass panels.

References
 Radu Olteanu (2002). Bucureștii în date şi întâmplări ("Bucharest in facts and events"), Paideia Publishing House, Bucharest
 Cristian Romano. "Iosif Romanov, librar, editor si tipograf din Bucuresti în prima jumatate a secolului al XIX-lea," in Anuarul arhivelor municipiului Bucuresti, no. 1/1996, pp. 32–42.

1833 establishments in Romania
Bars and nightclubs in Bucharest
Commercial buildings completed in 1833
Inns in Bucharest
Lipscani
19th-century architecture in Romania